HDMS Kronprindsens Lystfregat (literally, "the crown prince's pleasure frigate") was a yacht launched in Britain in 1785. George III gave it to his nephew Frederick, the Crown Prince of Denmark. Kronprindsens Lystfregat cost £10,347 to build and furnish.> 

Then in 1807 Britain attacked Copenhagen. After their victory, the British took whatever vessels they hadn't destroyed, but made a conscious and conspicuous exception of Kronprindsens Lystfregat. In a gesture of contempt, the Danes crewed her with a contingent of 17 captured British sailors, placing one of them in command and sent her back to Britain.

Captain William Anderson, late of Hope, of Dundee, sailed the yacht Prince Frederick back to England. The Admiralty paid his expenses and gave him a present of 40 guineas. 

The Royal Navy took her into service as the royal yacht, HMS Prince Frederick, succeeding a previous ship of that name - it is unclear whether in the yacht's case this was after George's nephew, father or second son, all called Frederick. On 25 July 1816 the Admiralty registered her as a third rate and renamed the yacht HMS Princess Augusta after Augusta, George's second daughter. Captain Thomas Hardy commanded Prince Frederick/Princess Augusta for three years prior to her sale.

The Admiralty put her and her predecessor, also named Princess Augusta, up for sale and sold her to Thomas Pittman on 13 August 1818 for £500. It is not clear that she got much use, either in Denmark or the United Kingdom.

Notes, citations, and references
Notes

Citations

References
  

1785 ships
Ships of the Royal Dano-Norwegian Navy
Ships of the line of the Royal Navy
Ships built in Deptford